A Certain Smile, A Certain Sadness is an album by Astrud Gilberto and Walter Wanderley, recorded in September 1966.

It was released by Verve Records at the height of the Bossa Nova craze in the United States, and featured the two most popular Bossa Nova musicians at the time: vocalist Astrud Gilberto and organist Walter Wanderley. A 1998 CD reissue added two songs recorded during the same sessions that yielded the album.

Track listing

Personnel 
 Astrud Gilberto – vocals
 Walter Wanderley – organ
 José Marino – bass
 Claudio Slon – drums
 Bobby Rosengarden – percussion
Technical
 Creed Taylor – producer
 Chuck Stewart – cover photograph

Also, João Gilberto (or possibly Marcos Valle) may have played guitar on tracks 2, 7, and 13.

References 

1967 albums
Astrud Gilberto albums
Walter Wanderley albums
Bossa nova albums
Portuguese-language albums
Verve Records albums
Albums produced by Creed Taylor